In condensed matter physics, a spin glass is a  magnetic state characterized by randomness, besides cooperative behavior in freezing of spins at a temperature called 'freezing temperature' Tf.  In ferromagnetic solids, component atoms' magnetic spins all align in the same direction.  Spin glass when contrasted with a ferromagnet is defined as "disordered" magnetic state in which  spins are  aligned randomly or without a regular pattern and the couplings too are random.

The term "glass" comes from an analogy between the magnetic disorder in a spin glass and the positional disorder of a conventional, chemical glass, e.g., a window glass.  In window glass or any amorphous solid the atomic bond structure is highly irregular; in contrast, a crystal has a uniform pattern of atomic bonds.  In ferromagnetic solids, magnetic spins all align in the same direction; this is analogous to a crystal's lattice-based structure.

The individual atomic bonds in a spin glass are a mixture of roughly equal numbers of ferromagnetic bonds (where neighbors have the same orientation) and antiferromagnetic bonds (where neighbors have exactly the opposite orientation: north and south poles are flipped 180 degrees).  These patterns of aligned and misaligned atomic magnets create what are known as frustrated interactions – distortions in the geometry of atomic bonds compared to what would be seen in a regular, fully aligned solid.  They may also create situations where more than one geometric arrangement of atoms is stable.

Spin glasses and the complex internal structures that arise within them are termed "metastable" because they are "stuck" in stable configurations other than the lowest-energy configuration (which would be aligned and ferromagnetic).  The mathematical complexity of these structures is difficult but fruitful to study experimentally or in simulations; with applications to physics, chemistry, materials science and artificial neural networks in computer science.

Magnetic behavior
It is the time dependence which distinguishes spin glasses from other magnetic systems.

Above the spin glass transition temperature, Tc, the spin glass exhibits typical magnetic behaviour (such as paramagnetism).

If a magnetic field is applied as the sample is cooled to the transition temperature, magnetization of the sample increases as described by the Curie law. Upon reaching Tc, the sample becomes a spin glass and further cooling results in little change in magnetization. This is referred to as the field-cooled magnetization.

When the external magnetic field is removed, the magnetization of the spin glass falls rapidly to a lower value known as the remanent magnetization.

Magnetization then decays slowly as it approaches zero (or some small fraction of the original value—this remains unknown). This decay is non-exponential and no simple function can fit the curve of magnetization versus time adequately. This slow decay is particular to spin glasses. Experimental measurements on the order of days have shown continual changes above the noise level of instrumentation.

Spin glasses differ from ferromagnetic materials by the fact that after the external magnetic field is removed from a ferromagnetic substance, the magnetization remains indefinitely at the remanent value. Paramagnetic materials differ from spin glasses by the fact that, after the external magnetic field is removed, the magnetization rapidly falls to zero, with no remanent magnetization. The decay is rapid and exponential.

If the sample is cooled below Tc in the absence of an external magnetic field and a magnetic field is applied after the transition to the spin glass phase, there is a rapid initial increase to a value called the zero-field-cooled magnetization. A slow upward drift then occurs toward the field-cooled magnetization.

Surprisingly, the sum of the two complicated functions of time (the zero-field-cooled and remanent magnetizations) is a constant, namely the field-cooled value, and thus both share identical functional forms with time, at least in the limit of very small external fields.

Edwards–Anderson model
In this model, we have spins arranged on a -dimensional lattice with only nearest neighbor interactions similar to the Ising model. This model can be solved exactly for the critical temperatures and a glassy phase is observed to exist at low temperatures. The Hamiltonian for this spin system is given by:

 

The sum runs over all nearest neighbor positions on a lattice, of any dimension. The variables  representing the magnetic nature of the spin-spin interactions are called bond or link variables.

 

Solving for the free energy using the replica method, below a certain temperature, a new magnetic phase called the spin glass phase (or glassy phase) of the system is found to exist which is characterized by a vanishing magnetization  along with a non-vanishing value of the two point correlation function between spins at the same lattice point but at two different replicas:

 

where  are replica indices. The order parameter for the ferromagnetic to spin glass phase transition is therefore , and that for paramagnetic to spin glass is again .

Under the assumption of replica symmetry, the mean-field free energy is given by the expression:

Sherrington–Kirkpatrick model
In addition to unusual experimental properties, spin glasses are the subject of extensive theoretical and computational investigations. A substantial part of early theoretical work on spin glasses dealt with a form of mean-field theory based on a set of replicas of the partition function of the system.

An important, exactly solvable model of a spin glass was introduced by David Sherrington and Scott Kirkpatrick in 1975. It is an Ising model with long range frustrated ferro- as well as antiferromagnetic couplings. It corresponds to a mean-field approximation of spin glasses describing the slow dynamics of the magnetization and the complex non-ergodic equilibrium state.

Unlike the Edwards–Anderson (EA) model, in the system though only two-spin interactions are considered, the range of each interaction can be potentially infinite (of the order of the size of the lattice). Therefore, we see that any two spins can be linked with a ferromagnetic or an antiferromagnetic bond and the distribution of these is given exactly as in the case of Edwards–Anderson model. The Hamiltonian for SK model is very similar to the EA model:

 

where  have same meanings as in the EA model. The equilibrium solution of the model, after some initial attempts by Sherrington, Kirkpatrick and others, was found by Giorgio Parisi in 1979 with the replica method. The subsequent work of interpretation of the Parisi solution—by M. Mezard, G. Parisi, M.A. Virasoro and many others—revealed the complex nature of a glassy low temperature phase characterized by ergodicity breaking, ultrametricity and non-selfaverageness. Further developments led to the creation of the cavity method, which allowed study of the low temperature phase without replicas. A rigorous proof of the Parisi solution has been provided in the work of Francesco Guerra and Michel Talagrand.

The formalism of replica mean-field theory has also been applied in the study of neural networks, where it has enabled calculations of properties such as the storage capacity of simple neural network architectures without requiring a training algorithm (such as backpropagation) to be designed or implemented.

More realistic spin glass models with short range frustrated interactions and disorder, like the Gaussian model where the couplings between neighboring spins follow a Gaussian distribution, have been studied extensively as well, especially using Monte Carlo simulations. These models display spin glass phases bordered by sharp phase transitions.

Besides its relevance in condensed matter physics, spin glass theory has acquired a strongly interdisciplinary character, with applications to neural network theory, computer science, theoretical biology, econophysics etc.

Infinite-range model
Unlike the Edwards–Anderson model, similar to the SK model, the interaction range is still infinite. The Hamiltonian for this model is described by:

 

where  have similar meanings as in the EA model. The  limit of this model is known as the random energy model. In this limit, it can be seen that the probability of the spin glass existing in a particular state, depends only on the energy of that state and not on the individual spin configurations in it.
A gaussian distribution of magnetic bonds across the lattice is assumed usually to solve this model. Any other distribution is expected to give the same result, as a consequence of the central limit theorem. The gaussian distribution function, with mean  and variance , is given as:

 

The order parameters for this system are given by the magnetization  and the two point spin correlation between spins at the same site , in two different replicas, which are the same as for the SK model.

Non-ergodic behavior and applications
A thermodynamic system is ergodic when, given any (equilibrium) instance of the system, it eventually visits every other possible (equilibrium) state (of the same energy). One characteristic of spin glass systems is that, below the freezing temperature , instances are trapped in a "non-ergodic" set of states: the system may fluctuate between several states, but cannot transition to other states of equivalent energy. Intuitively, one can say that the system cannot escape from deep minima of the hierarchically disordered energy landscape; the distances between minima are given by an ultrametric, with tall energy barriers between minima. The participation ratio counts the number of states that are accessible from a given instance, that is, the number of states that participate in the ground state. The ergodic aspect of spin glass was instrumental in the awarding of half the 2021 Nobel Prize in Physics to Giorgio Parisi.

For physical systems, such as dilute manganese in copper, the freezing temperature is typically as low as 30 kelvins (−240 °C), and so the spin-glass magnetism appears to be practically without applications in daily life. The non-ergodic states and rugged energy landscapes are, however, quite useful in understanding the behavior of certain neural networks, including Hopfield networks, as well as many problems in computer science optimization and genetics.

Self-induced spin glass

In 2020, physics researchers at Radboud University and Uppsala University announced they had observed a behavior known as self-induced spin glass in the atomic structure of neodymium.  One of the researchers explained, "...we are specialists in scanning tunneling microscopy. It allows us to see the structure of individual atoms, and we can resolve the north and south poles of the atoms. With this advancement in high-precision imaging, we were able to discover the behavior in neodymium, because we could resolve the incredibly small changes in the magnetic structure."  Neodymium behaves in a complex magnetic way that had not been seen before in a periodic table element.

History of the field

A detailed account of the history of spin glasses from the early 1960s to the late 1980s can be found in a series of popular articles by Philip W. Anderson in Physics Today.

See also

Antiferromagnetic interaction
Cavity method
Crystal structure
Geometrical frustration
Orientational glass
Phase transition
Quenched disorder
Random energy model
Replica trick
Spin ice

Notes

References

Literature
. ShieldSquare Captcha
. Papercore Summary http://papercore.org/Sherrington1975
.
.
.
.
 .
.
 Papercore Summary http://papercore.org/Parisi1980.
.

External links
Papercore summary of seminal Sherrington/Kirkpatrick paper 
Statistics of frequency of the term "Spin glass" in arxiv.org

Magnetic ordering
Theoretical physics
Mathematical physics